AustralianSuper is an Australian superannuation fund headquartered in Melbourne, Victoria. With approximately one in every ten Australian workers as members, it is Australia's largest superannuation fund.

AustralianSuper is an industry superannuation fund run only to profit members. AustralianSuper has a MySuper authority, meaning it can accept default contributions from an employer on behalf of employees who have not nominated a superannuation fund. AustralianSuper also offers a 'Member Direct' option, allowing users greater control in selecting a portfolio of Australian shares, ETF's, term deposits and cash. AustralianSuper is owned by the Australian Council of Trade Unions (ACTU) and employer peak body the Australian Industry Group (Ai Group).

History
AustralianSuper was established on 1 July 2006 through the merger of Australian Retirement Fund (ARF) and Superannuation Trust of Australia (STA). Ian Silk, who was the CEO of ARF, became the CEO of AustralianSuper; while Mark Delaney, who was the CEO of STA, became the Deputy CEO and CIO of AustralianSuper.

As of 2017, AustralianSuper had more than 120 billion assets invested around the world, including shares, transport infrastructure, office blocks, and shopping centres; including two-thirds of London's Kings Cross Central development.

As of June 2018, AustralianSuper was managing approximately 140 billion for 2.2 million members, growing to 155 billion in May 2019.

In June 2022, Labour Union Co-operative Retirement Fund (LUCRF) Super was merged into AustralianSuper. 

In 2022, the company launched a new digital platform including a new online portal and mobile phone applications. The updates were met with severe criticism as members were unable to access their accounts and were unable to get any answers from the customer support portals.

See also
Australian Retirement Trust
Aware Super
Hostplus
UniSuper
Vanguard Super

References

External links
 

Australian companies established in 2006
Financial services companies established in 2006
Superannuation funds in Australia